Mercer University School of Law (historically Walter F. George School of Law) is the professional law school of Mercer University. Founded in 1873, it is one of the oldest law schools in the United States; the first law school accredited by the bar in Georgia, and the second oldest of Mercer's 12 colleges and schools.  The School of Law has approximately 440 students and is located in Macon, Georgia on its own campus one mile (1.6 km) from Mercer's main campus.  The law school building, one of Macon's most recognizable sites, is a three-story partial replica of Independence Hall in Philadelphia and is located on Coleman Hill overlooking downtown Macon. According to Mercer's official 2020 ABA-required disclosures, 72% of the Class of 2020 obtained full-time, long-term, JD-required employment nine months after graduation.

Dean of the School

Karen Sneddon began as Interim Dean on October 1, 2021. She was preceded by Cathy Cox.

Cathy Cox became dean in 2017. She was previously president of Young Harris College.  Cox is an alumnus of Mercer University School of Law, a former member of the Georgia House of Representatives, served two terms as Georgia's secretary of state, 1999-2007, and is currently president of Georgia College & State University.

Her predecessor was Daisy Hurst Floyd who had been reappointed as dean in 2014.  She assumed responsibility from Gary J. Simson, dean from 2010–14, who was elevated by Mercer to a university-wide position as senior vice provost for scholarship.  Floyd previously served as dean from 2004–10 and is a senior member of the law school faculty.

Walter F. George

The School of Law is named for Walter F. George, Mercer Law class of 1901, who served as United States Senator from Georgia from 1922–57 and as President pro tempore from 1955-57.  Before election to the Senate, he served as a Judge of the Georgia Court of Appeals in 1917 and as a Justice of the Georgia Supreme Court from 1917-22.  Mercer named its law school the Walter F. George School of Law of Mercer University in 1947.  Fred M. Vinson, Chief Justice of the United States, participated in the naming ceremony.

The Walter F. George Foundation, created when the school was named, continues to fund scholarships for Mercer law students who have a demonstrated interest in pursuing a career in public service.  Walter F. George Foundation Public Service Scholarships cover full tuition for three years of law school along with community service grants for first-year and second-year summer public service internships.

Centennial

The School of Law celebrated its centennial in 1973.  The principal event occurred on November 18, 1973; participants included Richard Nixon, President of the United States and Jimmy Carter, Governor of Georgia and future President of the United States.  In his speech, President Nixon announced the nation's third Nimitz-class nuclear aircraft carrier would be named in honor of Carl Vinson, Mercer Law class of 1902.  Vinson, who was present at the event, was the first member of the United States House of Representatives to serve for more than 50 years (he served 1914-65), and was the long-time chairman of the House Armed Services Committee.  Also present were Secretary of Defense Melvin Laird and Secretary of the Navy John Warner.

Accreditation and rankings

The School of Law has been a member of the Association of American Law Schools since 1923 and has been fully accredited by the  American Bar Association (ABA) since 1925. It is the first law school to be ABA accredited in the state of Georgia.

In the 2022 edition of its law school rankings, U.S. News & World Report ranked Mercer 128th of the 200 ABA approved law schools.  The same edition ranked Mercer's legal writing program third in the nation.  The legal writing program has been ranked in the top three since US News & World Report began the speciality ranking in 2006.

The Princeton Review includes Mercer in the 2021 edition of its "Best Law Schools";

Statistics

The School of Law enrolls approximately 390 students and has a faculty of approximately 30 full-time professors and 30 adjunct professors.  The following degrees are offered:  Juris Doctor (JD), a joint Juris Doctor/Master of Business Administration (JD/MBA) in conjunction with Mercer's Eugene W. Stetson School of Business and Economics, and a Master of Laws (LLM) in Federal Criminal Practice and Procedure, which is the nation's only LLM program with this subject matter focus.  The school publishes the Mercer Law Review, the oldest law review in Georgia (founded in 1949), and the Journal of Southern Legal History.

The School of Law's model curriculum, the Woodruff Curriculum, named for philanthropist George W. Woodruff, is viewed as a model for law schools across the United States.  The curriculum, based on small classes and a practice oriented approach, focuses on legal ethics, professional responsibility, and legal writing and has been honored with the prestigious Gambrell Professionalism Award from the American Bar Association.

The School of Law houses the Mercer Center for Legal Ethics and Professionalism, established in 2000 and dedicated to fostering and teaching ethics and professionalism in the practice of law, and the National Criminal Defense College, a not-for-profit organization established in 1985 and devoted to improved trial advocacy and trial practice.

Law Library

The Furman Smith Law Library, named for Furman Smith, Mercer Law class of 1932, is the school's center of legal research. A premier facility, the library is used by lawyers and judges from across the state and recognized for its superior resources and service. Large windows in the library provide students with views of historic Macon from the law building's location on Coleman Hill.

Employment 
According to Mercer's official 2020 ABA-required disclosures, 72% of the Class of 2020 obtained full-time, long-term, JD-required employment nine months after graduation. Mercer's Law School Transparency under-employment score is 19.2%, indicating the percentage of the Class of 2020 unemployed, pursuing an additional degree, or working in a non-professional, short-term, or part-time job nine months after graduation.

Costs
The total cost of attendance (indicating the cost of tuition, fees, and living expenses) at Mercer for the 2013-2014 academic year is $57,800. The Law School Transparency estimated debt-financed cost of attendance for three years is $214,493.

Notable alumni

Mercer alumni recently headed two of Georgia's three branches of government:  Nathan Deal '66, was the Governor of Georgia, 2011–2019; Hugh P. Thompson '69, was the Chief Justice of the Georgia Supreme Court, 2013–16.  In the Georgia General Assembly, Judson H. Hill, Sr. '86, served until 2017 as Chairman of the Senate Finance Committee; William T. Ligon, Jr. '86, served as Chairman of the Senate State and Local Governmental Operations Committee.  M. Yvette Miller '80, Sara L. Doyle '94, and Michael P. Boggs '90 are judges of the Georgia Court of Appeals.

Judiciary
Griffin Bell - Federal Appeals Court Judge, 1962–76; 72nd Attorney General of the United States, 1977-79
Michael P. Boggs - Judge, Georgia Court of Appeals, 2012–17; Associate Justice, Georgia Supreme Court, 2017–22; Chief Justice, Georgia Supreme Court, 2022–present
William Augustus Bootle - Judge, Federal District Court for the Middle District of Georgia, 1954–81; ordered admission of the first African-American to the University of Georgia, 1961; namesake of the William Augustus Bootle Federal Building and United States Courthouse in Macon
G. Harrold Carswell - Judge, Federal District Court for the Northern District of Florida, 1958–69; Judge, United States Court of Appeals for the Fifth Circuit, 1969–70; unsuccessful nominee to the United States Supreme Court, 1970
Abraham Benjamin Conger - Judge, Federal District Court for the Middle District of Georgia, 1949–53  
Bascom Sine Deaver - Judge, Federal District Court for the Middle District of Georgia, 1928–44
Albert John Henderson - Federal Appeals Court Judge, 1979–99; Judge, Federal District Court for the Northern District of Georgia, 1968–79
Richard Henry Mills - Judge, Federal District Court for the Central District of Illinois, 1985–present
Carlton Mobley - Chief Justice, Georgia Supreme Court, 1972–74; Associate Justice, 1954-72; United States Representative, Georgia's 6th Congressional District, 1932–33 
Willie Louis Sands - Judge, Federal District Court for the Middle District of Georgia, 1994–present; the first African-American to serve on the court
Marc Treadwell - Judge, Federal District Court for the Middle District of Georgia, 2010–present
Julian Webb - Judge, Georgia Court of Appeals, 1974-1979, and member of the Georgia State Senate, 1963-1974
Charles W. Worrill - Justice, Georgia Supreme Court, 1953–1954

Politics
Doug Barnard - United States Representative, Georgia's 10th Congressional district, 1977–93
William Bradley Bryant - Georgia Superintendent of Schools, 2010–11
Cathy Cox - Georgia Secretary of State, 1999-07, the first woman elected to this position; President, Young Harris College, 2007–present
Edward E. Cox - United States Representative, Georgia's 2nd Congressional district, 1925–52 
Nathan Deal - United States Representative, Georgia's 9th Congressional district, 1993-10; Governor of Georgia, 2011-19
Peter Zack Geer - Georgia Lieutenant Governor, 1963–67  
Walter F. George - United States Senator from Georgia, 1922–57, served as President pro tempore, 1955–57; namesake of Mercer's Law School
Buck Melton - Mayor of Macon, Georgia, 1975-79
Michael Meyer von Bremen - Georgia State Senator, 1999-09; served as the Democratic Party Senate Minority Leader, 2002–09 
John Oxendine - Georgia Insurance Commissioner, 1995-11
Robert Reichert - Mayor of Macon and former member of the Georgia House of Representatives, 2007–present
Dwight L. Rogers - United States Representative, Florida's 6th Congressional district, 1945–54
Christopher N. Smith - Honorary Consul of the Kingdom of Denmark
Malcolm C. Tarver - United States Representative, Georgia's 7th Congressional district, 1927–47
Carl Vinson - United States Representative for over 50 years, 1914–65; long-time Chairman, House Armed Services Committee; has been called the "patriarch of the armed services" and the "father of the two-ocean navy"; namesake of the USS Carl Vinson
William S. West - United States Senator from Georgia for the year 1914 (appointment to fill unexpired term); instrumental in the founding of Valdosta State University
J. Mark Wilcox - United States Representative, Florida's 4th Congressional district, 1933–39
John S. Wood - United States Representative, Georgia's 9th Congressional district, 1931–35 and 1945–53; Chairman, House Un-American Activities Committee, 1949–53

Arts, media, and non-government public service
Glen Ashman - author of the Georgia Municipal Court Judges Benchbook
Steve Berry - author of six novels including several New York Times bestsellers
Brainerd Currie - law professor; noted conflict of laws scholar who developed the characterisation concept of governmental interest analysis
Nancy Grace - anchor for Court TV, legal commentator, and host of Nancy Grace on the Headline News television network 
Jay Sekulow - Chief Counsel, American Center for Law and Justice
L. Lin Wood - high profile trial attorney; has represented Richard Jewell, the parents of JonBenét Ramsey, Gary Condit, Kobe Bryant, and Herman Cain

References

External links
Mercer University School of Law
 

Law schools in Georgia (U.S. state)
Mercer University